State Route 285 (SR 285) is a primary state highway in the U.S. state of Virginia. Known as Tinkling Spring Road, the state highway runs  from SR 608 and SR 935 near Fishersville north to U.S. Route 250 (US 250) in Fishersville in eastern Augusta County.

Route description

SR 285 begins at its intersection with SR 608 and SR 935 (Expo Road) southwest of Fishersville. Tinkling Spring Road continues south as SR 608 toward Stuarts Draft. SR 285 heads northeast as a two-lane undivided road through a diamond interchange with Interstate 64 and passes the Augusta Health medical center. The state highway veers east and briefly parallels CSX's North Mountain Subdivision before reaching its northern terminus at US 250 (Jefferson Highway) just south of its crossing of the railroad in the village of Fishersville.

Major intersections

References

External links

Virginia Highways Project: VA 285

285
State Route 285